Flora MacNeil, MBE (6 October 1928 – 15 May 2015) was a Scottish Gaelic Traditional singer. MacNeil gained prominence after meeting Alan Lomax and Hamish Henderson during the early 1950s, and continued to perform into her later years.

Early life
MacNeil was born in 1928 into a Gaelic-speaking and Roman Catholic family inside her parents' croft at Ledag, Castlebay, on the island of Barra, which is sometimes called, "the island the Reformation never reached". There were singers on both sides of the MacNeil family, but the menfolk were often away at sea for long periods, leaving the women to raise the children and tend the croft – while constantly singing to assuage their labours. Her mother was Ann Gillies. Her father, Seumas MacNeil, worked as a fisherman and died when Flora was 14.

In these pre-television and pre-radio days, ceilidhs were a regular occurrence on Barra, and from earliest childhood MacNeil later remembered "soaking up" literally hundreds of songs, as if by osmosis. While most of MacNeil's repertoire was learned from her mother, one of Flora's other sources was her mother's cousin, Mary Johnstone. Johnstone's parents had lived locally, but had been evicted during the Highland Clearances. They had moved first to Bernerary and then to Mingulay, before their daughter moved back to her ancestral district on Barra. In later years, Johnstone would regularly visit Flora's mother and often sang at local ceilidhs and, for this reason, Flora's repertoire also included many Gaelic songs from both Benerary and Mingulay.

Clearly, the music was in her blood: by age four, famously, she was already tackling the sophisticated Jacobite war poetry of Mo rùn geal òg ("My Fair Young Love"), one of the Òrain Mòr, or "Big Songs"."Traditional songs tended to run in families and I was fortunate that my mother and her family had a great love for the poetry and the music of the old songs. It was natural for them to sing, whatever they were doing at the time or whatever mood they were in. My aunt Mary, in particular, was always ready, at any time I called on her, to drop whatever she was doing, to discuss a song with me, and perhaps, in this way, long forgotten verses would be recollected. So I learned a great many songs at an early age without any conscious effort. As is to be expected on a small island, so many songs deal with the sea, but, of course, many of them may not originally be Barra songs. Nevertheless the old songs were preserved more in the southernmost islands of Barra and South Uist possibly because the Reformed Church tended to discourage music elsewhere."

Music career 
Following her father's death, a 14-year old Flora left school to work in the island's telephone exchange to help provide for her family. In 1949, the Post Office offered her a position in Edinburgh, where she immediately moved. Word of MacNeil's talents as a Gaelic singer had already preceded her and she was embraced by Edinburgh Communist poets and folk song promoters Hugh MacDiarmid, Hamish Henderson and Sorley MacLean. With their assistance, she found a public platform in the burgeoning round of Edinburgh ceilidhs and concerts that marked the first stirrings of the British folk revival. Sorley MacLean and Hamish Henderson also arranged for American musicologist Alan Lomax to meet MacNeil and record her singing. When Lomax first arrived in Scotland in June 1951, he later recalled, "It was in Edinburgh one June night in the house of Sorley MacLean, a poet, that Scotland really took hold of me. A blue-eyed girl from the Hebrides was singing." The girl was Flora MacNeil and the song was Cairistiona. 
Henderson also invited MacNeil to perform at the 1951 Edinburgh People's Festival Ceilidh. The ceilidh brought Scottish traditional music to a large public stage for the first time inside Edinburgh's Oddfellows Hall and continued long afterwards at St. Columba's Church Hall in August 1951. The Scottish Gàidhealtachd was represented at by Flora MacNeil, fellow Barra native Calum Johnston, and John Burgess. The music was recorded live at the scene by Alan Lomax. During the Ceilidh, two Scottish Gaelic songs about the Jacobite rising of 1745 were performed onstage. Barra-native Calum Johnston, who was "keen to show his own admiration for [the] poet and for the Highlanders who fought for Charlie", delivered a passionate rendition of Alasdair Mac Mhaighstir Alasdair's Òran Eile don Phrionnsa ("Another Song to the Prince"). Flora MacNeil then performed, Mo rùn geal òg, Christine Ferguson's lament for her husband, William Chisholm of Strathglass, who fell as part of the Jacobite Army while bearing the standard of Clan Chisholm at the Battle of Culloden in 1746.

Following the performance of several border ballads and Scottish Traveller songs, Henderson announced that the concert goers were, "due back in the Western Highlands". Flora MacNeil then performed the Waulking song Cò siod thall air stràid na h-eala? ("Who is That Yonder on the Swan Road?"). MacNeil then performed the Gaelic lament, Mo nighean donn bhòidheach ("My Lovely Brown-Haired Girl").

Towards the end of the Ceilidh, master of ceremonies Hamish Henderson announced that Calum Johnston would be performing Roderick Morison's Òran do MhacLeoid Dhunbheagain ("A Song to MacLeod of Dunvegan"). The song had been composed as a rebuke to Norman MacLeod, 22nd Chief of Clan MacLeod, for not fulfilling "the obligations of his office". Instead of patronizing the Bards and holding feasts at Dunvegan Castle for his clansmen, the Chief had become an absentee landlord in London, who "spent his money on foppish clothes". Instead, Morison urged the Chief in vain to emulate his predecessors.

Henderson said of the song, "it's one of the great songs in the Gaelic tongue, and the poetic concept in it is very great. The poet says that he left the castle, and he found on the slopes of the mountain the echo of past mirth, the echo of his own singing. And he then has a conversation with the echo about the fate of the House of MacLeod."

In a further declaration of the pro-Soviet sympathies of the organizers, Henderson ended the Ceilidh by singing a Scots language tribute, set to the tune of Scotland the Brave, to John Maclean, a major figure in the Red Clydeside era, whom the text inaccurately claimed as the fiere, or comrade, of Vladimir Lenin and the "mate" of Karl Liebknecht.

Henderson then concluded the Ceilidh by singing what was then Scotland's de facto national anthem, Scots Wha Hae by Robert Burns.

Until 1954, the Edinburgh People's Festival Ceilidhs were an annual event. Eventually, however, the fact that Henderson and many other board members and organizers were members of the Communist Party of Great Britain caused the Ceilidhs to lose the backing and involvement of all members of both the Labour Party and the Scottish Congress of Trade Unions.

In 1975, Peter Kennedy acknowledged MacNeil as the source for each of the 24 Scottish Gaelic songs which appeared in his volume Folksongs of Britain and Ireland.

Flora MacNeil recorded two albums, Craobh nan Ubhal in 1976 (reissued in 1993) and Orain Floraidh in 2000.

While performing in 2000 at the annual Christmas Island Ceilidh in Cape Breton, Nova Scotia, MacNeil spread her arms wide and cried, "You are my people!" The hundreds of Canadian-born Gaels in the audience erupted into loud cheers.

In 2005, Alan Lomax's recording of the 1951 Ceilidh was released for purchase on compact disc by Rounder Records. This and all of Lomax's other recordings have since been digitized and made available online by the Association for Cultural Equity.

Personal life
In 1955, Flora MacNeil married fellow Barra native, Alister MacInnes, who worked as a lawyer in Glasgow, where the couple raised their five children; Kenneth, Cairistiona, Seumas, Maggie and Donald.

Death and legacy
Flora MacNeil died after a short illness on 15 May 2015, aged 86.

Numerous Gaelic traditional singers such as Karen Matheson and Julie Fowlis have cited MacNeil as an important influence on their careers.

Flora's daughter, Maggie MacInnes, is also a Gaelic traditional singer and harpist.

References

Further reading
Edited by Eberhard Bort (2011), 'Tis Sixty Years Since: The 1951 Edinburgh People's Festival Ceilidh and the Scottish Folk Revival, Grace Note Publications, Grange of Locherlour, Ochertyre, Scotland.
 Edited by Peter Kennedy (1984), Folksongs of Britain and Ireland, Oak Publications.

External links
Alan Lomax Recordings
Traditional Music Hall of Fame
Description of a 2000 Ceilidh in Cape Breton, Nova Scotia

1928 births
2015 deaths
20th-century Scottish women singers
British storytellers
Members of the Order of the British Empire
People educated by school in the Outer Hebrides
People from Barra
Scottish Gaelic singers
Scottish Roman Catholics